is a railway station located in Nakamura-ku, Nagoya, Japan and is on the Kintetsu Nagoya Line.

Layout
Kasumori Station has two elevated side platforms serving a track each.

Platforms

Staff at our station 

The number of passengers per day of the station is as follows.

Year       number of people 

 2015 11 10     4059
 2012 11 13     3795
 2010 11  9      3789
 2008 11 18     4018
 2005 11  8      3728

Adjacent stations

Railway stations in Aichi Prefecture